Doug Chivas (c.1922–2004) was an Australian rally and racing car driver. Chivas drove the first Lotus Mark 6 in Australia in the early 1950s winning many races.

Career
In the 1960s and 1970s he drove for some of the most important racing and rally teams in the country, including the Mitsubishi works rally team, Alec Mildren’s Alfa Romeo team, the Holden Dealer Team and the factory-supported Chrysler Series Production teams of the early 1970s.

Chivas won the 1967 Surfers Paradise Four Hour race with Kevin Bartlett in a Mildren team Alfa Romeo Giulia Super. He registered class wins at the Bathurst 500 in 1963, 1967 and 1968 and won a hard-fought final round of the Toby Lee Series in 1971 driving a Chrysler Valiant Charger E38.

In 1972 Chivas achieved the best result for the Chrysler team at Bathurst by finishing third outright and second in class in a Charger E49.

Chivas is best remembered however for a sensational second place at the 1973 Hardie-Ferodo 1000. While co-driving with Peter Brock in the Holden Dealer Team's leading LJ Torana GTR XU-1 the car ran out of fuel and had to be pushed by Chivas, unaided (as per the rules), along part of pit lane that went slightly uphill. The exhausted 50-year-old had to be supported by pit crew after the effort of pushing the car in the hot conditions (and being flung aside by an anxious Brock), but the time lost may have cost the Brock/Chivas Torana a Bathurst victory. Chivas had been sent a message via his pit board to "GET MAX LAPS", but unfortunately went one lap too far and ran out of fuel at the Reid Park section of the 6.172 km (3.835 mi) Mount Panorama Circuit, though luckily from there most of the over 3 km back to the pits was downhill. According to popular theory, the car should have coasted into the pits without the need for Chivas to get out and push, but he tried to bump start the car just before he got to the pits hoping there was enough fuel left to re-start; the car came to a stop about 20 metres short of the pit entry.

Career results

Complete Bathurst 500/1000 results

References

Further reading
Australia's Greatest Motor Race 1960-1999 (Chevron) © 2000
Australian Motor Racing Annual 1971

External links
Vale Doug Chivas

1922 births
2004 deaths
Australian rally drivers
Australian Touring Car Championship drivers